Whitaker's Mill Historic District is a national historic district near Joppa, Harford County, Maryland, United States. It includes three early- to mid-19th-century buildings: the -story rubble stone Whitaker's Mill built in 1851, the -story rubble stone miller's house, and the log-and-frame Magness House, begun about 1800 as the miller's house for the first mill on the site. The district also includes an iron truss bridge known as Harford County Bridge No. 51, constructed in 1878, and the oldest such span in the county.  The grist mill closed operations about 1900.

It was added to the National Register of Historic Places in 1990.

References

External links
, including photo dated 1989, at Maryland Historical Trust

Historic districts in Harford County, Maryland
Historic districts on the National Register of Historic Places in Maryland
Federal architecture in Maryland
Greek Revival architecture in Maryland
Grinding mills in Maryland
National Register of Historic Places in Harford County, Maryland
Grinding mills on the National Register of Historic Places in Maryland